Thousands of Evils is an EP by Swedish progressive metal band Vildhjarta. It was released digitally in Europe on 30 September 2013, and worldwide in digital form and on a limited 1,000 copy 12" vinyl press on 29 October 2013. The EP was made available on Spotify on 3 October 2013. The band released a "forte" version of the EP, as limited gatefold marbled LP (vinyl), limited CD, and digitally on 28 January 2022.

Background
On 13 September 2013, Vildhjarta released a music video of the track 'Dimman' and announced their participation in a North American tour with Veil of Maya, Here Comes the Kraken, Northlane, and Structures. On 1 October 2013, Terrorizer premiered the track 'Regnar Bensin'.

Critical reception
Ultimate Guitar gave the album a 7.5/10, concluding their review by saying "As far as djent goes, Vildhjarta is a pretty interesting group. They do a lot of things right, such as creating very ambient compositions and mixing a lot of "hard" and "soft" sounds so the EP isn't like a non-stop full-on assault from beginning to end. The band shows they aren't afraid to occasionally use clean and acoustic guitars, which really adds a lot of character to their music."

The Circle Pit praised the album, awarding it 9.5/10 and writing that "Thousands of Evils rages and fumes and stomps through a good 20+minute long spiral road in five different directions. The only thing common between the record and its predecessor is the same foreboding in the guitar tones, the same unmerciful chugging riffs- but then again, it’s a “DIFFERENTLY DARK" fable."

Heavy Blog Is Heavy also gave the album a positive review, awarding it 4/5. They wrote that "Hopefully they can take all of the critiques and constructive criticism into consideration when making their follow up LP next year, because this band has extremely high amounts of potential, and are on the right track to reaching it at the fullest. Vildhjarta have found their niche and are sticking with it, and their next album will definitely be an example of that."

Premiering the track 'Regnar Bensin', Terrorizer were positive about the EP as well, writing that "Veering from crushing heavy to eerily calm, ‘Thousands of Evils’ is quite a journey indeed."

Forte edition
A remixed/remastered edition of Thousands of Evils was released on January 28, 2022. The reissue was titled Thousands of Evils(forte) and it features revamped/redone drums and bass guitar. Most production and mixing was done by the band's current drummer Buster Odeholm, with assistance from Sworn In drummer Chris George.

Track listing

Personnel
Adapted from vinyl liner notes.

Vildhjarta
 Daniel Ädel – vocals
 Vilhelm Bladin – vocals
 Johan Nyberg – bass
 Daniel Bergström – guitar
 Calle-Magnus Thomér – guitar
 David Lindkvist – drums

Additional
 Produced by Daniel Bergström
 Mixed and mastered by Christian Svedin
 Artwork by Rickard Westman
 Music written by Daniel Bergström and Calle-Magnus Thomér
 All orchestration written by Patrick Marchente
 All lyrics by Daniel Ädel and Vilhelm Bladin

References

2013 EPs
Century Media Records EPs
Vildhjarta EPs